Please don't delete this article because this actor or actress is new and will play/is playing a lead, supporting or breakthrough role in the tokusatsu series "Kamen Rider Ex-Aid" and will continue their career and make more roles, either lead or supporting, after the end of the programme.

 is a Japanese actor, voice actor, writer, and director. He is represented with Office PSC.

Kote graduated from Takehaya Senior High School. He also graduated from Waseda University School of Education. After belonging to the theatre club in the university, Waseda University Theater Club, Kote presided over the Gekidan innerchild. He specializes in psychology and mythical specialized drama, he is deeply aware of Japanese mythology, especially Kojiki. Kote is familiar with his own style and the gap as an actor is intense.

Filmography

Anime

Video games

Stage

Variety shows

Films

TV dramas

Internet videos

References

External links
 (Office PSC) 
 

Japanese male musical theatre actors
Japanese male voice actors
Waseda University alumni
Male actors from Kanagawa Prefecture
1973 births
Living people